The Christian Democratic Party is a centre-left political party in East Timor.

In the parliamentary election held on 30 August 2001, the party won 2.0% of the popular vote and 2 out of 88 seats. In the parliamentary election held on 30 June 2007, the PDC won 4,300 votes, 1.03% of the total, and did not win any seats in parliament, as it did not reach the 3% threshold to win seats.

References

Christian democratic parties in Asia
Political parties in East Timor